A nagari is a semi-autonomous Minangkabau people regional administrative unit in West Sumatra, Indonesia.

From 1983-1999 the national government attempted to apply the Javanese desa village system to other ethnic groups throughout Indonesia, and in 1983 the traditional Minangkabau nagari village units were split into smaller jorong units, with some disruption to traditional nagari-centred social and cultural institutions. However following restoration of the role of the nagari in rural Minangkabau society after 1999 residence and employment in a nagari is still an aspect of social identity, just as residence in the smaller jorong, or membership of a clan.

Etymology
Nagari comes from the Sanskrit word  which means land or realm.

History
The nagari system already existed before the Dutch colonial times as "autonomous village republics" in Minangkabau society. The nagari comprises five fundamental institutions : it must have a road (berlebuh), bathing place (bertapian), meeting hall (berbalai), mosque (bermesjid) and square (bergelenggang).

See also

 Minangkabau
 
 
 Surau
 Kampong
 Villages of Indonesia

References

Minangkabau
Geography of West Sumatra
Populated places in West Sumatra